Todd Slater is an American poster artist who specializes in concert posters for indie and mainstream rock musicians. The many acts for whom he has produced posters include Jack White, Widespread Panic, Ween, Avett Brothers, Pearl Jam, Arctic Monkeys, Foo Fighters, Queens of the Stone Age, Dave Matthews, Black Keys, Primus, Muse, and Neil Young. He also produces film posters for the specialist Mondo Gallery in Austin, Texas, USA.

A limited edition fine art print of Todd Slater’s Goldfinger Mondo film poster was sold at auction by Christie's in October 2013 for $3,294 US.

Background

Personal life
Slater was born in July 1979 in Peoria, Illinois, United States. His father, Wayne Slater, is an author and has been a political writer for the Dallas Morning News since the mid-1980s; he has co-written three books with James Moore, including Bush's Brain. Todd Slater's mother is an English teacher. The Slater family moved to Austin, Texas when Todd was five years old. Slater is married to wife Kristie with whom he has three children.

Education
Todd Slater graduated from Stephen F. Austin State University, Nacogdoches in Texas in 2002, majoring in art with an emphasis on design and minors in film and painting.

Slater learned about digital media during an internship with Dave Turton at The Graphic Library, a producer of stock illustrations for Istockphoto.

Career
Slater realized that making concert posters was what he wanted to do after discovering  gigposters.com. He started producing posters professionally when aged 24.

His first professional poster commission was for Pretty Girls Make Graves. He started sending unsolicited White Stripes poster designs to the band's tour manager and this led to him working with Rob Jones, who produced The White Stripes' gig posters, and later collaborations between Jones and Slater on gig posters for Jack White and Dave Matthews.

Slater turned freelance in 2004.

Influences
Todd Slater has cited a number of artistic influences including:
 1966–1968 Chicago art movement The Hairy Who
 Fear and Loathing in Las Vegas (an influence on some of Slater’s imagery)
 Figurative painters including Steven Assael, Lisa Yuskavage, Jenny Saville, John Currin and Peter Saul
 Aesthetic Apparatus
 Ames Bros.

Work
Much of Slater's work is for major alternative bands, although he also has produced tour posters for some established and mainstream artists. Although not a core part of Slater's work he has expressed an interest in album cover art, and produced six vinyl single sleeves for The Dead Weather in 2009.

Slater produces film posters for the Mondo Gallery.

Stylistically Slater's gig poster designs tend to concentrate on the imagery and minimize the amount and size of text. Most of his work is done on a computer with some elements done by hand. Each poster takes about 40 hours to produce.

Concert poster clients
Artists for whom Todd Slater has produced gig posters include:

Arcade Fire 
Arctic Monkeys
The Avett Brothers 
Bad Religion
The Beastie Boys
The Black Keys
Bob Dylan
Bruno Mars
CAKE 
Colonel Claypool 
The Cramps
Dave Matthews
Dead Weather 
Death Cab For Cutie
Decemberists 
Eddie Vedder
Edward Sharpe and the Magnetic Zeros 
Eisley
Elvis Costello 
Fleetwood Mac
Foo Fighters 
Franz Ferdinand
Green Day 
Guided by Voices
Incubus
Jack Johnson 
Jack White 
Keane
The Lumineers 
Luna
Madonna 
Mars Volta
MGMT 
Misfits 
Modest Mouse 
Mogwai
Morrissey 
Mumford & Sons 
Muse 
The National
Neil Young 
Pearl Jam 
Phish 
Pixies
Pretty Girls Make Graves
Queens of the Stone Age 
Radiohead 
Reverend Horton Heat
Slayer
The Strokes 
Taking Back Sunday 
Tegan and Sara
They Might Be Giants 
Velvet Revolver 
Ween 
White Stripes
Widespread Panic 
Wilco 
Yeah Yeah Yeahs 
Yo La Tengo

Artist web pages featuring Todd Slater’s work:
Arctic Monkeys
Muse
Primus

Film posters
Film posters Todd Slater has produced for the Mondo Gallery include:

The Big Lebowski 
Boogie Nights
Clerks
Close Encounters of the Third Kind
Evil Dead II
Goldfinger
Great Warrior (Star Wars)
Jurassic Park
Labyrinth
Office Space
Pacific Rim
Plan 9 from Outer Space
Planet of the Apes
QT Fest 6
Repo Man
RoboCop
Star Trek: The Corbomite Maneuver
Stargate
Treebeard (The Lord of the Rings)

Bibliography
The following books feature Todd Slater's work:
 Slater, Todd (12 October 2015). The Rock Poster Art of Todd Slater. Flood Gallery Publishing, .
 Loren, Derek & Farren, Mick (November 2013). Classic Rock Posters. Metro Books, .
 Booth, Tom (2012). The Wall: Inside The Poster Studio Vol. 2. Badtown
 Rabin, Nathan with Yankovic, Al (September 2012). Weird Al: The Book. Harry N. Abrams, .
 Durchholz, Daniel & Graff, Gary (November 2012). Neil Young: Long May You Run: The Illustrated History. Voyageur Press, .
 Maiffredy, Didier (December 2012). Rock Poster Art: Sérigraphies de concert. Eyrolles, .
 Booth, Tom (2011). The Wall: Modern Day Music Posters. Badtown.
 Klanten, R & Hellige, H (May 2011). Impressive: Printmaking, Letterpress and Graphic Design. Gestalten, .
 Hunter, Dave (October 2010). Star Guitars: 101 Guitars That Rocked the World. Voyageur Press, .
 Hayes, Clay (April 2009). Gig Posters Volume 1. Quirk Books, .
 Klanten, Robert (April 2009). Naïve: Modernism and Folklore in Contemporary Graphic Design. Gestalten, .
 Hellige, Hendrick (May 2007). Supersonic: Visuals for Music. Die Getalten Verlag, .
 Kaye, Joyce Rutter (editor) (2007). Print: Regional Design Annual 2007. Print Magazine, ASIN B0012HMZE4.
Other publications featuring Todd Slater's work:
 Gig Posters: 2016 Wall Calendar. Amber Lotus Publishing.

Documentaries 
The following documentaries feature Todd Slater and/or his work:
 Died Young, Stayed Pretty / Dir: Eileen Yaghoobian / Norotomo Productions / 2008
 Just Like Being There / Dir: Scout Shannon / Avalanche Films / 2012
 Twenty-Four by Thirty-Six / Dir: Kevin Burke / Post No Joes Productions / 2016

References

External links 
 www.toddslater.net

1979 births
Living people
Album-cover and concert-poster artists
American poster artists
Artists from Peoria, Illinois
American illustrators
Artists from Austin, Texas
Stephen F. Austin State University alumni